Osbert Burr Loomis (July 30, 1813–April 30, 1886) was an American portrait painter. He is a founder of the Loomis Chaffee School.

Loomis, the fourth son of James and Abigail S. (Chaffee) Loomis, was born in Windsor, Connecticut, July 30, 1813. He graduated from Yale College in 1835. After graduation, he studied with Samuel F. B. Morse, the President of the National Academy, in New York City ; and in the winter of 1836 he began his career as a portrait painter, in Charleston, South Carolina. On January 19, 1843, he married Jeannette H , eldest daughter of the Rev. Dr. Samuel F. Jarvis of Middletown, Conn. In January, 1844, he went with his wife to Havana, Cuba, where their residence continued until May, 1862. Loomis soon became the most esteemed portrait painter in Havana, and besides painted a number of altarpieces for churches and chapels. On his return from Cuba he settled in New York City, where his residence continued—varied by foreign travel—until his death there, April 30, 1886, in his 73rd year. His wife survived him without children.

References

External links
 

1813 births
1886 deaths
Yale College alumni
People from Windsor, Connecticut
Painters from Connecticut